The following highways are numbered 437:

Canada
Newfoundland and Labrador Route 437

Japan
 Japan National Route 437

United States
  Louisiana Highway 437
  Maryland Route 437
  New York State Route 437
  Pennsylvania Route 437
  Puerto Rico Highway 437
  Tennessee State Route 437